Falconet may refer to:

Birds of prey
 Typical falconets (genus Microhierax)
 Spot-winged falconet (genus Spiziapteryx)
 White-fronted falconet

People
 Étienne Maurice Falconet (1716–1791), French sculptor
 John Falconet (fl. 1350–1400), English noble
 Peter Falconet (1741–1791), French portrait painter

Other uses
 The Falconet, a 1975 Iranian film
 Falconet (cannon), a light cannon developed in the late 15th century
 Falconet (novel), an unfinished novel by Benjamin Disraeli

See also

 Atlanta Falcons Cheerleaders, originally known as "The Falconettes"
 Falcon (disambiguation)